Garrett McLaughlin (born November 10, 1997) is an American soccer player who currently plays for USL League One side North Carolina FC.

Career

Youth and college 
McLaughlin played high school soccer at Heritage Hall, where he was a two-time Oklahoma Gatorade Player of the Year and led the school to 3 state championships.

McLaughlin played four years of college soccer at Southern Methodist University between 2016 and 2019.  McLaughlin made 72 appearances, scored 36 goals and tallied 13 assists for the Mustangs.  He was named the 2016 American Athletic Conference Freshman of the Year, first team All-AAC in 2017 and 2019, second team All-AAC in 2018, and United Soccer Coaches third team All-American in 2017.

While at college, McLaughlin appeared for USL PDL side OKC Energy U23.

Professional 
On January 9, 2020, McLaughlin was selected 8th overall in the 2020 MLS SuperDraft by Houston Dynamo.

On February 27, 2020, McLaughlin signed for Houston's USL Championship affiliate side Rio Grande Valley FC. He made his professional debut on March 8, 2020, starting in a 5–1 loss to LA Galaxy II.

On April 22, 2021, McLaughlin signed with USL League One side Toronto FC II. He scored two goals on his debut for the club on May 22, 2021 against North Texas SC. On July 18, he scored a hat trick in a 4-2 victory over North Carolina FC, including a bicycle kick on his second goal. He finished the season as the team's leading goal scorer with 8 goals and was named Player of the Week twice. After the season, he went on trial with Major League Soccer club Real Salt Lake.

McLaughlin joined North Carolina FC on February 11, 2022. On May 30, 2022, McLaughlin was named USL League One Player of the Week for Week 9 of the 2022 season, in recognition of his brace over Richmond Kickers on May 28.

Career statistics

References

External links 
 Garrett McLaughlin – Men's Soccer SMU bio
 

1997 births
Living people
American soccer players
Association football forwards
Houston Dynamo FC draft picks
North Carolina FC players
Rio Grande Valley FC Toros players
SMU Mustangs men's soccer players
Soccer players from Oklahoma
Sportspeople from Oklahoma City
Toronto FC II players
USL Championship players
USL League Two players